Pineridge may refer to:
 Pineridge, Bahamas
 Pineridge, Calgary, Alberta, Canada
 Pineridge, California, United States